"Shooting the messenger" is a metaphoric phrase used to describe the act of blaming the bearer of bad news.

Until the advent of modern telecommunication, messages were usually delivered by human envoys. For example, in war, a messenger would be sent from one camp to another. If the message was unfitting, the receiver might blame the messenger for such bad news and take their anger out on them.

History
An analogy of the phrase can come from the breaching of an unwritten code of conduct in war, in which a commanding officer was expected to receive and send back emissaries or diplomatic envoys sent by the enemy unharmed. During the early Warring States period of China, the concept of chivalry and virtue prevented the executions of messengers sent by opposing sides.

An early literary citing of "shooting the messenger" is in Plutarch's Lives: "The first messenger, that gave notice of Lucullus' coming was so far from pleasing Tigranes that, he had his head cut off for his pains; and no man dared to bring further information. Without any intelligence at all, Tigranes sat while war was already blazing around him, giving ear only to those who flattered him".

A related sentiment was expressed in Antigone by Sophocles as "no one loves the messenger who brings bad news" or "no man delights in the bearer of bad news".

The sentiment that one should not shoot the messenger was expressed by Shakespeare in Henry IV, Part 2 (1598) and in Antony and Cleopatra: Cleopatra threatens to treat the messenger's eyes as balls when told Antony has married another, eliciting the response "Gracious madam, I that do bring the news made not the match."

The term also applied to a town crier, an officer of the court who made public pronouncements in the name of the ruling monarch, and often including bad news. Harming a town crier was considered treason.

Current application
A modern version of "shooting the messenger" can be perceived when someone blames the media for presenting bad news about a favored cause, person, organization, etc. "Shooting the messenger" may be a time-honored emotional response to unwanted news, but it is not a very effective method of remaining well-informed."

Getting rid of the messenger may be a tactical move, but danger found in nondisclosure may result in either hostile responses or negative feedback from others. "People learn very quickly where this is the case, and will studiously avoid giving any negative feedback; thus the 'Emperor' continues with the self-delusion....Obviously this is not a recipe for success". Barbara Ehrenreich in Bright-sided/Smile or Die argued that a culture of "thinking positive" so as to "purge 'negative people' from the ranks...[fed into] the bubble-itis" of the 2000s.

Reactions to the whistleblowing organization WikiLeaks led to calls not to shoot the messenger.

Similar phrases
A syntactically similar expression is "Please do not shoot the pianist. He is doing his best". It originated around 1860 in the Wild West of the United States. Oscar Wilde, during his 1883 tour of the United States, saw this saying on a notice in a Leadville, Colorado, saloon. This phrase is sometimes attributed to Mark Twain, but neither Wilde nor Twain ever claimed authorship.

Alternative expressions:
 "Killing the messenger"
 "Attacking the messenger"
 "Blaming the bearer of bad tidings"

See also

References

External links

Injustice
Metaphors referring to war and violence
Metaphors referring to people
Censorship